Veitchia arecina, commonly known as Montgomery palm, is a species of flowering plant in the family Arecaceae. It grows to between 25' to 35' (7.60m to 10.60m) and has white or yellow blooms.

It is found only in Vanuatu. It is threatened by habitat loss. It is being offered as a landscape design suggestion in areas of Florida where the annual low temperatures do not exclude it as a choice.

References

arecina
Trees of Vanuatu
Endemic flora of Vanuatu
Endangered plants
Taxobox binomials not recognized by IUCN